The peso was the currency of Nicaragua between 1878 and 1912. It was Nicaragua's first national currency, replacing the Central American Republic real and that of neighbouring states. It was subdivided into 100 centavos and when it was introduced, it was worth 8 reales, and had the same weight and mass as the peso fuerte, but due to recurrent devaluations, it was replaced by the córdoba at a rate of  pesos = 1 peso fuerte = 1 córdoba.

Coins
In 1878, cupro-nickel 1 centavo coins were introduced, followed, in 1880, by silver 5, 10 and 20 centavos. In 1898 and 1899, cupro-nickel 5 centavos coins were issued. These were the last coins of this currency to be minted.

Banknotes
From 1881, the National Treasury issued notes in denominations of 1, 5, 25, 50 and 100 pesos. 10, 20 and 50 centavos notes were added in 1885, followed by 10 pesos notes in 1894.

References

 
 

Modern obsolete currencies
Economic history of Nicaragua
1878 establishments in Nicaragua
1912 disestablishments
Currencies of Nicaragua